Jackson Kyle Garden-Bachop (born 3 October 1994) is a New Zealand rugby union player of Cook Islands descent who currently plays as a fly-half for the  in the international Super Rugby competition.

Early career

Born in Dunedin, Garden-Bachop is of Māori, Samoan, French Polynesian and Cook islander ancestry and was  raised in Wellington, Garden-Bachop played rugby at Scots College in the city.   He is the son of former All Black Stephen Bachop and former Black Fern Sue Garden-Bachop.

Senior career

Garden-Bachop debuted for the Wellington Lions as a teenager during the 2013 ITM Cup making a solitary appearance.   Over the course of the next 3 seasons, he gradually became a more frequent starter and by the 2016 season he could call himself Wellington's starting number 10.

Super Rugby

Unable to land a contract with one of New Zealand's five Super Rugby franchises, Garden-Bachop decided to hop across the Tasman Sea to join Australian side, the Melbourne Rebels.   He signed a 2-year contract prior to the 2017 Super Rugby season.

Garden-Bachop has signed a two-year contract with the Wellington Hurricanes to begin in 2018.

International

Garden Bachop represented New Zealand at schoolboy level in 2012 and under-20 level in 2014. In 2017 Garden-Bachop was named in the Māori All Blacks squad for their tour of France and  Canada he played in all games.

Super Rugby Statistics

References

1994 births
Living people
New Zealand rugby union players
Rugby union fly-halves
Rugby union fullbacks
Wellington rugby union players
People educated at Scots College, Wellington
Rugby union players from Wellington City
New Zealand expatriate rugby union players
Expatriate rugby union players in Australia
New Zealand expatriate sportspeople in Australia
New Zealand sportspeople of Cook Island descent
New Zealand people of French Polynesian descent
New Zealand sportspeople of Samoan descent
Bachop-Mauger family
Māori All Blacks players
Hurricanes (rugby union) players
Melbourne Rebels players
Hanazono Kintetsu Liners players